HD 36780 is a star located in Orion's belt, within the equatorial constellation of Orion. It has an orange hue and is dimly visible to the naked eye with an apparent visual magnitude of +5.92. The distance to this object is approximately 534 light years based on parallax. It is drifting away from the Sun with a radial velocity of 84 km/s, having come to within  some 2.1 million years ago.

This is an aging giant star with a stellar classification of K4 III. After exhausting the supply of hydrogen at its core, the star cooled and expanded off the main sequence. At present it has around 31 times the girth of the Sun. It is radiating 243 times the luminosity of the Sun from its swollen photosphere at an effective temperature of 4,108 K.

References

K-type giants
Orion (constellation)
Durchmusterung objects
036780
026108
1874